Nataša Meškovska (born 9 February 1972) is a Macedonian swimmer. She competed at the 1992 Summer Olympics and the 1996 Summer Olympics.

References

1972 births
Living people
Macedonian female swimmers
Olympic swimmers of North Macedonia
Olympic swimmers as Independent Olympic Participants
Swimmers at the 1992 Summer Olympics
Swimmers at the 1996 Summer Olympics
Sportspeople from Skopje